Charles Prince (born 1950) is a former chief executive officer of Citigroup.

Charles Prince may also refer to:

Charles H. Prince (1837–1912), U.S. Representative from Georgia
Charles Prince (died 1973), ex Royal Air Force, after whom Charles Prince Airport is named
Charles Prince (cricketer) (1874–1949), South African wicket-keeper
Charles A. Prince (1869–1937), American bandleader, pianist and organist known for conducting the Columbia Orchestra
Charles Prince (actor) (1872–1933), French silent film comedian
Virginia Prince (1912–2009), American transgender activist who sometimes went by Charles Prince

See also
Prince Charles (disambiguation)